Andrea Falconieri (1585 or 1586 – 1656), also known as Falconiero, was an Italian composer and lutenist from Naples. He resided in Parma from 1604 until 1614, and later moved to Rome, and then back to his native Naples, where in 1647 he became maestro di cappella at the royal chapel.

External links

Italian Baroque composers
1580s births
1656 deaths
Italian male classical composers
17th-century Italian composers
17th-century male musicians